Gloria Fatalis  is a 1922 Dutch silent film directed by Johan Gildemeijer.

Cast
 Emmy Arbous - Operazangeres
 Gustav Adolf Semler - Schoolmeester
 Mimi Irving - Hun dochter

External links 
 

1922 films
Dutch silent feature films
Dutch black-and-white films